Sminthea is a genus of deep-sea hydrozoans of the family of Rhopalonematidae,

Species
 Sminthea apicigastrica Xu, Huang & Du, 2009
 Sminthea eurygaster Gegenbaur, 1857

References

Rhopalonematidae
Hydrozoan genera